Saba T. Soomekh is an Iranian-born American professor and author.

Early life and education 
Soomekh was born in Tehran, Iran, to a Persian-Jewish family. to Hamid and Manijeh Soomekh.  She is a sister of Hollywood actress Bahar Soomekh. The Iranian-Jewish family moved to Los Angeles, California in 1978 to escape the Islamic Revolution of Iran with Soomekh only two years old.

She attended Beverly Hills High School and received her bachelor's degree from the University of California, Berkeley in 1998, her Masters in Theological Studies from Harvard Divinity School in 2001, and a Ph.D. in Religious Studies from the University of California, Santa Barbara.

Teaching career 
Saba Soomekh is the associate director of research at UCLA's Alan D. Leve Center for Jewish Studies.  She was previously a theological studies professor in the Religious Studies Department at California State University, Northridge and at Loyola Marymount University, where she also served as Interim Director of the Jewish Studies program.

Soomekh also teaches at the University of California, Los Angeles and previously taught at California State University, Fullerton, American Jewish University and Santa Monica College.

Writing career 
Soomekh is the author of "From the Shahs to Los Angeles: Three Generations of Iranian Jewish Women between Religion and Culture" published by State University of New York Press.  The book won the 2013 Independent Publisher Book Awards gold medal for religion.  She has written extensively on the Iranian Jewish community and on women in the Middle East.

References

External links 
 Cal State Northridge biography

American Sephardic Jews
American people of Iranian-Jewish descent
Iranian emigrants to the United States
Living people
American Mizrahi Jews
People from Tehran
Iranian Jews
University of California, Santa Barbara alumni
Harvard Divinity School alumni
University of California, Berkeley alumni
Loyola Marymount University faculty
1976 births
Iranian diaspora studies scholars